Erky Perky is an animated television program on YTV developed by CCI Entertainment and Ambience Entertainment, with CGI animation by Australian Visual Effects company The LaB Sydney. It follows two bickering, dim-witted insects, Erky and Perky, who live at a hot dog stand before accidentally being taken to a house. They try to settle into the house, living with fellow house bugs, and hunting for food in a very clean kitchen.

Plot
Two bugs, the Scottish-accented Erky, and his friend, the cowardly and impressionable Perky, live an idyllic life on a downtown hot dog stand, a cornucopia of crumbs, relish and wieners. They live the high life until one day they are swept away in a take-out bag and end up in a sterile suburban kitchen with no food in sight. The two bickering, dim-witted and lazy bugs are forced to survive in the new and scary "Land of Kitchen". Every day, they are obsessed with finding food, and eventually finding their way home to "Hot Dog Stand". Their quests are almost always befouled by 'Mad' Margaret, the self-appointed ruler of Kitchen, and her 'sidekick' Cecil.

Characters 
Erquhart "Erky" Windsor (Jason Barr) is a Scottish-accented bug who normally takes Perky for granted and makes him try to get food in a dangerous scheme. He is blue with yellow spots. It was revealed in the episode "Perky vs. McBuggy Z" that he is a natural born rapper and dancer.
Percival "Perky" Rosenberg (Neil Crone) is Erky's friend and partner. He is very cowardly and very weak. It was made quite obvious that Perky has a crush on Margaret's niece, Sajuica. He is yellow with blue spots.
Cecil (Adrian Truss) appears to be somewhat smitten with the tyrant Margaret, despite being a tenth her size, becoming extremely jealous of her having affairs with newcomer Pablomo, and Erky (when he was under the influence of the Love Crumb).
Mad Margaret (Judy Marshak) is the self-appointed ruler of the kitchen, and usually stops Erky and Perky's plans and when they find food, she generally steals it.
Sajuica (Melissa Jane Shaw) is apparently the 'babe' of the kitchen, attracting flies, and being flirty. Even the childish Stinks (named for his flight-inducing farts) thinks she is 'fine'.  She fancies Perky.
Frenzel (Ron Rubin): While Stinks may be smart, it's another bug named Frenzel who takes the cake (literally) when it comes to devising food-getting plans. He always has profitable schemes on the go, preying on other bugs' naiveté or weaknesses to get himself ahead. Often, Perky is the one suffering, being a very gullible and trusting bug. An example of this is when Frenzel was showing young bugs the dangers of Kitchen, and for the final show he tricked Perky into being the German-accented spider, Delilah's 'dinner', not telling the frightened bug that it was all an act, and that there wasn't really any danger (unlike most of Frenzel's plans).
Moldy van Oldy (Keith Knight seasons 1–2, Rob Greenway season 3) is a senile old bug, Moldy van Oldy, who loves to talk and talk for hours, sometimes about actual events, sometimes nothing more than senseless ramblings. One true story he did tell, however, was the tale of Margaret's acquired hydrophobia. When she was about Sajuica's age, and living in an outdoor garden (along with Moldy and presumably other bugs as well), Margaret was sprayed with water from a hose, getting knocked out of the air.
Stinks (Annick Obonsawin seasons 1–2, Stacey Depass season 3) A running gag is that Stinks would appear whenever anyone said his 'name' (or any other word that sounds similar, such as thinks); often this happens when they are bemoaning some misfortune ('This stinks').
Delilah (Dana Brooks) is a German-accent spider who tells fortunes.
Boof (Carter Hayden) is Frenzel's assistant; he is a digger bug and was born from an egg that Perky found.
The Grand Armandor (Andrew Pifko) is Margaret's personal wing and purse designer.

Additional voices provided by Danny Wells, John Stocker, Linda Sorenson, Lawrence Bayne, Rick Miller, Robin Duke and Robert Tinkler.

Episodes

Season 1 
 Where Are We?
 A Toast to Erky
 Flights of Fancy
 Web of Death
 Burst My Bubble
 Sticky Situations
 Sucked In
 Tongue Tied
 Ghostly Goodies
 All That Cheese
 Cereal Thriller
 She Loves Me Not
 Erky's Birthday
 Location, Location, Location
 Got Ya!
 Perky the Brave
 Little Erky
 Go Team
 Key to the Kitchen
 Cold Snap
 The Good Days
 Double Dare
 Stinks Sinks
 Make Me Laugh
 The Intruder
 Return to Sender

Season 2 
 Buggy Bug Buggleson
 Boof is Born
 Broken Wings
 The Party
 Wildberry Implosion
 Party Pooper
 You Nut!
 Tomorrow's Outlook Fine
 Beautiful Music
 The Principle of the Thing
 Funny Bum
 Pantry of Horrors
 A Zen Tale
 Perky vs. MC Buggy Z
 Robobug
 A Dance in a Trance
 The Inseparables
 Pangs & Peaceful Protests
 Pablobo Returns
 Danger on the Windowsill
 Monument to Margaret
 Bug Bags
 Kitchen Day
 Bug in Baby's Clothes
 Roamin' Holiday
 Blueboy's Treasure

Season 3
 Zapped
 Flying High
 Bug Eater
 Mind Over Matter
 Car Trouble
 A Trojan Scheme
 Erky's Worst Nightmare
 Soldier Bugged
 Slim Perky
 Talking Tum
 Bug in From the Cold
 Alien Invasion
 Where's Cecil
 Bug in the Bubble
 To Bug or Not To Bug
 The Miracle Shootout
 Bug House
 Perky in Charge
 Magic Box
 Bugliebeard
 Pancake on the Fan
 Swat!
 Future Crumb 
 Paddle Whacker
 Pop Culture
 Up and Away

References

External links
 
 YTV Erky Perky page

YTV (Canadian TV channel) original programming
Animated television series about insects
2000s Canadian animated television series
2000s Australian animated television series
2006 Canadian television series debuts
2009 Canadian television series endings
2006 Australian television series debuts
2009 Australian television series endings
Australian children's animated fantasy television series
Canadian children's animated fantasy television series
Canadian computer-animated television series
Australian computer-animated television series
Television series by 9 Story Media Group
English-language television shows